The Taunton Green Historic District encompasses the core area of the historic 19th-century commercial downtown business district of Taunton, Massachusetts.  It is centered on the town green, laid out in the 1740s, and now stands at the intersection of U.S. Route 44 and State routes 140 and 138.  The district was listed on the National Register of Historic Places in 1985.

History
The early commercial center of the city of Taunton was southeast of the present center, at the confluence of the Taunton and Mill Rivers.  In the 18th century early industry in the form of sawmills and gristmills developed on the Mill River.  The Taunton Green was given to the town in 1743 as a militia training ground, and it is also where an early meetinghouse was built.  Originally  in size, it is now much reduced by the surrounding development.  Early commercial buildings were mostly of wood-frame construction, of which a few survive.

Taunton Green has historically the gathering place for troops headed to war. Monuments stand on the Green to honor soldiers of all the wars in which local citizens have participated.

"Tauntonians" gathered on the Green on October 21, 1774, to raise the Taunton Flag with its distinctive "Liberty and Union" motto. The flag was hoisted on a 112-foot liberty pole in defiance of King George III. The flag flies on the Green to the present day.

A fire in 1859 destroyed many buildings east of the green, and inaugurated more significant growth of brick buildings in the following decades.

Since 1914 the Green has been the site of the city's annual holiday light display which attracts visitors from throughout the area, giving Taunton the nickname of "The Christmas City."

In July 2004, the historic Templar's Hall (c. 1850) and Cohannet Block (1870) (commonly referred to as the Seeley Building) located on the corner of Taunton Green and Weir Street were destroyed by an arsonist.

Description

The historic district is centered on the roughly square green, and includes most of the buildings facing the green on the flanking streets.  It excludes the Bristol County Courthouse Complex, which is located on the north side of the green.  It extends for a short way along Broadway to the north and Main Street to the east.

Monuments on the Green honor soldiers of all the wars in which local citizens have participated. Among them is The Hiker, one of fifty copies of a statue by Theo Alice Ruggles Kitson. It commemorates the American soldiers who fought in the Spanish–American War, the Boxer Rebellion and the Philippine–American War. The statue was cast by the Gorham Manufacturing Company in nearby Providence, Rhode Island.

Contributing properties
(partial listing)
Taunton Green (historic town common)
J.R. Tallman & Co, Inc. (1913), 11-12 Court Street
Crocker Building (1898), 4 Court Street
Boys & Girls Club of Taunton (1913), 31 Court Street
43 Taunton Green (1831), current facade added in 1893
Dunbar Block (c. 1830), 44-49 Taunton Green
Union Block (1860), 1-37 Main Street
Bank Blocks (c. 1855), 4, 5 & 9 Taunton Green
Taylor Building (1889), 10-14 Taunton Green
Jones Block (1874), 5-29 Broadway
Donovan Building (c. 1900), 28 Broadway

Properties with separate NRHP Listings
United States Post Office (1932), 37 Taunton Green

See also
National Register of Historic Places listings in Taunton, Massachusetts
Taunton City Hall
Church Green

Gallery

References

External links

Gallery of vintage photos of the "Christmas City" display on Taunton Green

Historic districts in Bristol County, Massachusetts
Taunton, Massachusetts
National Register of Historic Places in Taunton, Massachusetts
1830 establishments in Massachusetts
Historic districts on the National Register of Historic Places in Massachusetts